Lucina may refer to:
 146 Lucina, a main belt asteroid
 Lucina (mythology), the goddess of childbirth in Roman mythology
 Saint Lucina, 1st-century Christian
 Crypt of Lucina, part of the catacombs of Rome
 Lucina C. Broadwell (1889-1919), U.S. murder victim

 Lucina, several genus names in zoology:
 Lucina (bivalve), a clam genus in family Lucinidae, established by Bruguière in 1797
 Lucina, a brush-footed butterfly genus invalidly established by Rafinesque in 1815; nowadays Melitaea
 Lucina, a marsh fly genus invalidly established by Meigen in 1830, nowadays Salticella
 Lucina, a cricket genus invalidly established by Walker in 1869, nowadays Phalangopsis
 Hamearis lucina, a butterfly

 Lucina (Fire Emblem), a character from the video game Fire Emblem Awakening also featured in the Super Smash Bros. series
 Lucina (typeface), a foundry type made by Ludwig & Mayer.

See also
 Lučina (disambiguation)
 Lúčina
 Lucina River (disambiguation)